Raymond Digman (14 November 1934 – March 2009) was an English cricketer. He was a right-handed batsman and right-arm medium-fast bowler who played for Cheshire. He was born in Liverpool.

Digman represented Cheshire in the Minor Counties Championship between 1955 and 1972, and in 1970 joined Sefton Cricket Club. Digman made two List A appearances for the team, though he scored a duck in each innings in which he played.

External links
Raymond Digman at CricketArchive 

1934 births
Living people
English cricketers
Cheshire cricketers
Cricketers from Liverpool